ECU Health (formerly Vidant Health) is a not-for-profit, 1,447-bed hospital system that serves more than 1.4 million people in 29 Eastern North Carolina counties. The health system is made up of nine hospitals and more than 12,000 employees. ECU Health also includes wellness centers, home health and hospice services, a dedicated children's hospital, rehab facilities, pain management and wound healing centers and specialized cancer care. Their flagship hospital, ECU Health Medical Center, is a level I trauma center and serves as the teaching hospital for the Brody School of Medicine at East Carolina University in Greenville. Its smaller, community-based hospital serve merely as patient feeders to the main hospital.  The main hospital has shuttered services at these facilities only to reroute state licenses and permits back to the main hospital. 

ECU Health is the largest private employer in Eastern North Carolina.

All nine ECU Health hospitals have achieved The Gold Seal of Approval for quality care by The Joint Commission, the leading accreditor of healthcare organizations in America.

In 2002, the organization implemented a program in which diabetes educators regularly visit rural clinics to improve glycemic control in African-American patients.

ECU Health changed their name from University Health Systems of Eastern Carolina in January 2012 to Vidant Health.

On January 3, 2022, Vidant Health announced that they would be rebranding as ECU Health. In the announcement, they indicated that it would take several months for the branding to be noticeable to the public.

ECU Health-owned hospitals 

 ECU Health Medical Center, Greenville - Flagship Hospital
 ECU Health Beaufort Hospital, Washington
 ECU Health North Hospital, Roanoke Rapids
 ECU Health Bertie Hospital, Windsor
 ECU Health Chowan Hospital, Edenton
 ECU Health Duplin Hospital, Kenansville
 ECU Health Edgecombe Hospital, Tarboro
 ECU Health Roanoke-Chowan Hospital, Ahoskie
 The Outer Banks Hospital, Nags Head (jointly owned with Chesapeake Regional Healthcare)

Former facilities:
 Vidant Pungo Hospital, Belhaven - Acquired 2011, closed 2014, demolished 2016

Its smaller, community-based hospital serve merely as patient feeders to the main hospital.  The main hospital has shuttered services at these facilities only to reroute state licenses and permits back to the main hospital.

Specialty facilities 
 East Carolina Endoscopy Center
 East Carolina Heart Institute
 James & Connie Maynard Children's Hospital at ECU Health Medical Center
 Marion L. Shepard Cancer Center
 Onslow Radiation Oncology
 Service League of Greenville Inpatient Hospice
 ECU Health Behavioral Crisis Center
 ECU Health Cancer Care at the Eddie and Jo Allison Smith Tower in Greenville
 ECU Health Cardiovascular & Pulmonary Rehabilitation
 ECU Health Health Foundation
 ECU Health Home Health &  Hospice
 ECU Health Medical Group Practices
 ECU Health Minor Emergency
 ECU Health Outpatient Rehabilitation
 ECU Health Pain Management Centers
 ECU Health Radiation Oncology
 ECU Health Sleep Centers
 ECU Health SurgiCenter
 ECU Health Wellness Centers
 ECU Health Wound Healing Centers

Services 
 Allergy and Asthma
 Arthritis and Rheumatology
 Bariatrics
 Behavioral Health
 Cancer
 Children's
 Dermatology
 Ear, Nose and Throat
 Emergency and Trauma
 Employee Health and Wellness
 Endocrinology
 Family Medicine and Primary Care
 Gastroenterology
 Geriatrics
 Heart and Vascular
 Home Health
 Hospice
 Immediate and Walk-In Care
 Nephrology
 Neurology and Neurosurgery
 Ophthalmology
 Orthopedics and Sports Medicine
 Pain Management
 Palliative Care
 Physical Medicine and Rehabilitation 
 Pulmonology and Respiratory
 Radiology
 Sleep
 Surgery
 Therapy and Rehabilitation
 Transplant
 Urology
 Wellness and Prevention
 Women's
 Wound

ECU Health EastCare 
ECU Health EastCare provides critical care air and ground transport service to all of eastern North Carolina. There are multiple ground units, including one dedicated to children's transport. EastCare's five air units are located in Beaufort, Nash, Craven, Wayne and Bertie counties. Both ground and air units provide rapid transportation and advanced medical care to critically ill and injured patients. Both air and ground transport programs serve all types of critical patients including trauma, cardiac, medical, high-risk obstetrics, burns, and pediatric.

ECU Health Foundation 
The ECU Health Foundation is an independent, non-profit, tax-exempt, charitable corporation that serves as the custodian for all financial gifts and bequests to ECU Health .

Governing board 
The governing board of ECU Health sets the policies that govern the operation and direction of ECU Health, ECU Health Medical Center and its subsidiaries. Members of the governing board meet monthly and are responsible for the articulation of its mission and values, the protection of assets and the quality of services. They serve voluntarily and without pay. Members of the governing board are chosen for their management experience and their standing as community leaders. They are chosen by the UNC Board of Governors and Pitt County Commissioners for a term of 5 years, not to exceed two consecutive terms.

ECU Health Board of Directors:

 Marcus S. Albernaz, MD
 Shirley A. Carraway, Ed.D.
 James W. "Jim" Chestnutt
 Charlester T. Crumpler, Jr.
 Ernest L. "Ernie" Evans
 Jimmy F. Garris
 Robert J. "Bob" Greczyn, Jr. 
 W. Phillip "Phil" Hodges
 J. Bryant Kittrell, III
 C. Bynum Satterwhite
 Anand "Andy" Tewari, MD

References

External links
ECU Health Homepage

Hospital networks in the United States
Medical and health organizations based in North Carolina
1997 establishments in North Carolina